One World Radio, also to referred as The official sound of Tomorrowland, is the official radio station and the content platform of Tomorrowland. It is completely free and available 24/7, with the goal of uniting the "People of Tomorrow" through the music every time of the year, not only on the festival season.

The digital radio station many electronic genres with daily, weekly and special monthly episodes. Just like the festival, One World Radio is all over the world with the international hosts and guests, it has millions of listeners in over 130 countries.

The success of One World Radio is due to the "impeccable selection" of music, but also the fact that all of the shows are later to be found on-demand right, after they go on air.

History 

One World Radio was launched as Radio DEEA in 1997,

In 2007, Lagardère bought the licenses of Radio DEEA, for the launch of Vibe FM in 2008. Although Lagardère bought only the radio licenses for Radio DEEA, but not the brand. Also, Radio 21 has also bought 21 radio licenses for Radio DEEA, also in 2007.

On April 7, 2008, Radio DEEA became Vibe FM, and the format for Vibe FM when it was launched was dance music, with the slogan Dancefloor Radio.

On July 15, 2021, Vibe FM became One World Radio, which is the Belgian music festival Tomorrowland's official radio station.

On July 1, 2022, One World Radio launched in the United Kingdom and Malta as DAB station as well as Spain as FM radio station in Mallorca and Ibiza.

2022 Broadcast Schedule 
In 2022, One World Radio has a large range of different radio shows from daily to monthly, these are

Daily Shows

 ‘Daybreak Sessions’ from 07:00 to 12:00 with Justin Wilkes (from London)
 ‘Around The World’ from 12:00 to 13:00 with Camille Pollie (from Brussels)
 ‘United Through Music’ from 13:00 to 19:00 with Adam K (from London)
 ‘Celebrate The Magic’ from 19:00 to 21:00 with Greg Jake (from Texas)

Weekly 

 Tomorrowland Friendship Mix, Thursday at 21:00 CEST
 Armin Van Buuren's Weekend Kick-Off, Friday at 19:00 CEST
 Tomorrowland Top 30 with NERVO, Friday at 17:00, Saturday at 12:00 and Sunday at 16:00 CEST
 UNreleased with Austin Kramer, Monday at 18:30 CEST
 Relive the Madness with MC Stretch, Monday and Wednesday at 21:00 CEST
 The Best of One World Radio, every Saturday on demand

Monthly

 CORE (hosted by Dino Lenny), Last Sunday of the month at 19:00 CET
 Future Friday with MORTEN, First Friday of the month at 20:00 CET
 Universal Nation with M.I.K.E. Push, First Tuesday of the month at 21:00 CET
 Wayback Luke with Laidback Luke, Second Tuesday of the month at 21:00 CET
 Label Showcase, Third Tuesday of the month at 21:00 CET
 Full Moon with Timmy Trumpet, On the day of the full moon
 Vintage Culture, Third Friday of the month at 20:00 CET
 Mash-Up Universe with DJs from Mars, Every Second Friday of the month 20:00 CET

Tomorrowland Top 1000
The Tomorrowland top 1000 is an annual countdown of "The Biggest Anthems In The History Of Tomorrowland" voted by the listeners

The Magical 500 
The magical 500 is an annual countdown of the top 500 songs released in the calendar year, voted by listeners

References 

Radio stations established in 2008
Radio stations in Romania
Mass media in Bucharest